Carabus morbillosus is a beetle of the family Carabidae.

Description 
These beetles usually have a bright metallic bronze green or purple sometimes even blue coloration. They feed on snails and small insects.

Distribution
This species occurs in France, Italy, Malta, Spain and in North Africa (Algeria, Libya, Morocco, Tunisia).

Subspecies
Carabus morbillosus alternans Palliardi, 1825
Carabus morbillosus constantinus Kraatz, 1899
Carabus morbillosus cychrisans Lapouge, 1899
Carabus morbillosus macilentus Vacher de Lapouge, 1899
Carabus morbillosus maroccanus Bedel, 1895
Carabus morbillosus morbillosus Fabricius, 1792

References

External links
Universal Biological Indexer
Video of Carabus morbillosus on You Tube

morbillosus
Beetles described in 1792
Beetles of Europe